Noel Naval Tata (born 1957) is an Irish businessman with Irish citizenship, who is the chairman of Trent and Tata Investment Corporation, the managing director of Tata International, and the vice chairman of Titan Company and Tata Steel.

Early life
Part of the Tata family, he is the son of Naval Tata and Simone Tata. He is the half-brother of the ex-chairman of Tata Group, Ratan Tata and Jimmy Tata.

Tata earned a bachelor's degree from the University of Sussex, and attended the International Executive Programme at INSEAD business school in France.

Career
He began his career at Tata International, the Tata Group's arm for the products and services offered abroad. In June 1999, he became the managing director of the Group's retail arm Trent, which was founded by his mother. By this time, Trent had acquired the department store Littlewoods International and changed its name to Westside. Tata developed Westside, turning it into a profitable venture. In 2003, he was appointed the director of Titan Industries and of Voltas.

In 2010-2011 it was announced that Tata was to become managing director of Tata International, the company dealing with the overseas business of the $70 billion conglomerate, raising speculation that he was being groomed to succeed Ratan Tata as the head of the Tata Group. However, in 2011 his brother-in-law Cyrus Mistry was announced as the successor to Ratan Tata. In October 2016, Cyrus Mistry was removed as the chairman of Tata Sons and Ratan Tata took over as the chairman of the group for four months until February 2017. He was made vice chairman of Titan Company in 2018, and in February 2019 was inducted onto the board of the Sir Ratan Tata Trust. On 29 March 2022, he was appointed vice chairman of Tata Steel.

Personal life
He is married to Aloo Mistry, the daughter of Pallonji Mistry, who was the single largest shareholder in Tata Sons (the Tata Group's holding company).

He is an Irish citizen.

References 

Businesspeople from Mumbai
Indian people of Swiss descent
Noel
1957 births
Living people
Tata Group people
Mistry family
Alumni of the University of Sussex